Linda Mendoza Kahle is an American film director and television director.

Mendoza's directorial career began in 1992, directing promotional segments for Fox and MTV. She then went on to direct/produce segments for Kidsongs and the Nickelodeon sketch comedy series' Roundhouse and All That. Her other television series credits include, The Chris Rock Show, The Brothers García, Unfabulous, Girlfriends, The Bernie Mac Show, Outsourced, MADtv, Scrubs, Gilmore Girls, 30 Rock, Unbreakable Kimmy Schmidt, Suburgatory, Crazy Ex-Girlfriend, and Brooklyn Nine-Nine among other series. She made her feature film directorial debut with the film Chasing Papi in 2003.

In 2008, Mendoza won an ALMA Award for her direction of the Ugly Betty episode, "Betty's Baby Bump". She is of Mexican American descent.

References

External links
 

American film directors
American film directors of Mexican descent
American television directors
American women film directors
American women television directors
Living people
Place of birth missing (living people)
Year of birth missing (living people)
21st-century American women